The Army–Navy Cup is an annual men's college soccer match between the United States Military Academy (Army) and the United States Naval Academy (Navy). Since its inaugural game in 2012, the game has been played on a neutral venue, much like its college football counterpart. Like the American football rivalry, the Cup is also held in the Philadelphia metro area. However, the cup is held at Subaru Park, the home field of Major League Soccer's Philadelphia Union.

Background 
Prior to the arrival of the neutral-site Army–Navy Cup, the two sides had met 77 times, and annually since 1938. In the first match between the two programs, the Army Black Knights defeated the Navy Midshipmen, 2–1 in West Point. Army would go on dominate the series through the late 1940s, with the Black Knights beating the Midshipmen 10 times to six. During this time, both programs were among the most elite college soccer programs in the nation. In 1945, Army was honored with an Intercollegiate Soccer Football Association (NCAA's predecessor) with a co-national championship, making it, to date, Army's only national soccer title. Navy also shared the title with Army, along with Yale and Haverford. In addition to the shared 1945 title, Navy has won three additional ISFA title, and one NCAA Division I Men's Soccer Championship. Navy's other ISFA championships came in 1932, 1943 and 1944. Their 1944 was an outright title, while their 1932 and 1943 titles were shared. Their 1932 title was shared with Penn, while their 1943 title was shared with Rensselaer.

Throughout the early 1950s until the mid-1970s, Navy's soccer team dominated Army. From their 1954 to 1974 encounter, Navy went undefeated against Army for a record 21 consecutive seasons, including knocking Army out of three NCAA Tournaments. In 1974, Army defeated Navy, 2-1 ending the Black Knights' drought against the Mids. Since the early 1980s, the series between the schools has been fairly even, although the programs have sporadically qualified for the NCAA Tournament in the last three decades. Navy most recently qualified in 2013, and prior to that was 1988. Army's last appearance in the NCAA Tournament came in 1996 against William & Mary.

Despite the lack of success on the pitch, both programs have still enjoyed a heated rivalry with each other, much of which mirrors of the rivalry seen across other college sports between the two sides. In the early 2010s, an effort began to press for a neutral site venue for their annual regular season encounter, which was solidified in mid-2012. On July 25, 2012, it was announced that the two programs would play at the then-called, PPL Park in Chester, Pennsylvania. The event, dubbed the "Army-Navy Cup" was hosted by the Philadelphia Union in conjunction with Keystone Sports and Entertainment and Global Spectrum. This marked the first time since 1966 the two programs met in Philadelphia, and the first time since 1994 the sides played against each other at a neutral venue. The second once was dubbed Army–Navy Cup II, indicating the possibility for a renewal each season.

Army–Navy Cup III drew a crowd of 10,168 making it the largest neutral crowd for the 2014 NCAA Division I men's soccer season, and the third-largest crowd for college soccer that year. Since this event, the Army–Navy Cup has been one of the highest attended college soccer events in the nation, and has enjoyed regional, local and national interest.

Despite the COVID-19 pandemic, the 2020/21 edition of the Army–Navy Cup was the largest attended game of the regular season with an attendance of 2,483.

Results

Pre-Cup era (1938–2011) 

The programs met 77 times prior to the Cup inauguration in 2012.

Cup era (2012–present)

See also 
 Commander-in-Chief's Trophy
 Army–Navy lacrosse rivalry

References 

College soccer rivalry trophies in the United States
College soccer rivalries in the United States
Army Black Knights men's soccer
Navy Midshipmen men's soccer
Awards established in 2012
2012 establishments in Pennsylvania